Abang Long Fadil is a 2014 Malaysian Malay-language action comedy film written and directed by Syafiq Yusof. It features an ensemble cast including Zizan Razak, Kamal Adli, Tauke Jambu, Soffi Jikan, Aaron Aziz, Yassin Yahya and the late Harun Salim Bachik. The film is the spin-off from 2011 film KL Gangster directed by Syafiq's older brother Syamsul Yusof and the first in Abang Long Fadil trilogy. The movie was released on May 29, 2014 and received positive reviews. Its sequels Abang Long Fadil 2 was released on August 24, 2017, followed by the third sequel, Abang Long Fadil 3 set to be released on September 8, 2022.

Synopsis
Fadil (Zizan Razak) did not want to interfere in the gangster world after his best friend, Malik (Aaron Aziz) was sentenced to five years imprisonment and wanted to be free from Shark's gang (Syamsul Yusof) but he has to carry out his last assignment as a gift to qualify for a gangster gang. The Shark, the enemy in the blanket to Malik, was not happy with Fadil, then Shark bullied Fadil by giving an impossible task to all the gangs at Kuala Lumpur to conquer the area of the Beran Village. Kampung Berani is the settlement of the Malays who are facing a landowner's crisis of settlers with capitalist companies who have hired a gang of gangsters to threaten the villagers. At the same time, the area is held by a large unknown gangster. Various events took place in Fadil's attempt to conquer Kampung Berani. Inadvertently, Fadil meets Adam (Kamal Adli) who is the son of a warrior and has amazing power. They joined forces against the gangsters in the area, eventually ending up with the largest gangster leader there.

Cast
 Zizan Razak as Fadil
 Kamal Adli as Adam
 Tauke Jambu as Acai
 Syamsul Yusof as Shark / Zack / Mus
 Aaron Aziz as Malek
 Soffi Jikan as Ajib
 Shiqin Kamal as Hawa
 Harun Salim Bachik as Pak Harun
 Yassin Yahya as Ustaz Abu
 Ruzaidi Abdul Rahman as Karim/Kimar
 Akmal Effendi Razak as Ismail
 Aman Graseka as Pailang
 Mak Jah as Mak
 A. Galak as Salim
 Pablo Amirul as Student 1
 Adnan Dzul as Student 2
 Ucop Cecupak as Bahri
 Ruzzlan Abdullah Shah as Lawyer Mr. Tnaka

Sequel

The movie's sequel, Abang Long Fadil 2 was released in August 2017. Syafiq returned to write and direct the sequel, in which Zizan reprising his roles with addition of new cast include Shuib Sepahtu, Achey Bocey and Tania Hudson. Yusof Haslam serves as the producer, with Najwa Abu Bakar from Astro Shaw acted as co-producer.

References

External links
 
 Laman Facebook rasmi peminat Abang Long Fadil

2014 films
Malay-language films
2014 action comedy films
Malaysian action comedy films
Skop Productions films
Films produced by Yusof Haslam
Films about contract killing
Films directed by Syafiq Yusof